The women's 4 × 400 metres relay at the 1991 IAAF World Indoor Championships was held on 10 March. It was the first time that this event was contested at the World Indoor Championships.

Results

References

Relay
4 × 400 metres relay at the World Athletics Indoor Championships
1991 in women's athletics